Grabówka  is a village in the administrative district of Gmina Supraśl, within Białystok County, Podlaskie Voivodeship, in north-eastern Poland. It is served by Białystok's bus system.

The village has a population of 1,191.

References

Villages in Białystok County